Asterohyptis is a genus of plants in the Lamiaceae, or mint family, first described in 1932. It is native to Mexico and Central America.

Species
Asterohyptis mocinoana (Benth.) Epling - widespread from Veracruz to Costa Rica
Asterohyptis nayarana B.L.Turner - Durango, Nayarit
Asterohyptis seemannii (A.Gray) Epling - Chihuahua, Sonora, Sinaloa
Asterohyptis stellulata (Benth.) Epling - from Sinaloa and Durango south to Honduras

References

Lamiaceae
Lamiaceae genera